Full general elections were held in Belgium on 27 May 1900.

They were the first elections under a proportional system (using the D'Hondt method) instead of a majority system. Belgium became the first country to adopt proportional representation as basis of its electoral system. To make the system possible, smaller electoral districts (arrondissements) were grouped into a single electoral district (a group of arrondissements). The introduction of proportional representation was beneficial to the Liberal Party, which significantly increased its number of seats. The Liberal Party previously suffered losses after the introduction of universal suffrage in 1894.

The Catholic Party thus lost seats but retained its absolute majority, with 86 of the 152 seats in the Chamber of Representatives and 44 of the 76 seats in the Senate.

Results

Chamber of Representatives

Senate

Constituencies
The distribution of seats among the electoral districts was as follows for the Chamber of Representatives. As the electoral system changed to a proportional one, the electoral arrondissements with only one or two representatives were grouped together to form larger ones. Each electoral district now had at least 3 representatives, with the exception of Neufchâteau-Virton.

References

Belgium
1900s elections in Belgium
General
Belgium